Dylan James Mullen (born February 10, 1994), better known as Smokeasac, is an American record producer, singer, and songwriter. He gained notoriety for being a frequent collaborator and producer for emo rap artist Lil Peep throughout his career.

Career

In 2018, Smokeasac began his solo career with single, "Leave You Behind," which was featured on BBC Radio 1's Rock Show with Daniel P. Carter. His debut EP, Wasteland999, was released on March 8, 2019. During his shows, Smokeasac sometimes plays music from Lil Peep's Come Over When You're Sober Pt. 2.

Smokeasac co-produced Lil Peep's Come Over When You're Sober, Pt. 1 and Come Over When You're Sober, Pt. 2 albums with George Astasio / The Invisible Men (Iggy Azalea, Sugababes). Rob Cavallo (My Chemical Romance and Linkin Park) was also a contributor.

Throughout the project, Smokeasac worked as the intermediary between Astasio and Lil Peep, and became an integral part of Part 2’s overall feel and essence.

Songs produced

Lil Peep

"Nineteen"
"Cobain"
"The Song They Played [When I Crashed Into The Wall]"
"Driveway"
"Hellboy"
"Benz Truck"
"Save That Shit"
"Awful Things"
"U Said"
"Better Off (Dying)"
"The Brightside"
"Problems"
"Avoid"
"Spotlight"
"Hate Me"
"Leanin"
"Broken Smile"
"Runaway"
"Sex With My Ex"
"Cry Alone"
"16 Lines"
"Life Is Beautiful"
"IDGAF"
"White Girl"
"Fingers"
"Benz Truck Pt. 2"
"Backseat"
"Sex Last Nite"
"Kiss"

Teddy

"Castle WIth No Light"
"Guap"
"Impossible"
"Foreign Banz"
"Dead Presidents"
"Cupid! (Shot Me In The Dark)"

Smokeasac

"Leave You Behind"
"BLACKOUT!"
"Losing My Mind"
"After I’m Gone"
"Insomnia" ft. Travis Barker
"One Bad Day"
 "Overdose"

References 

American record producers
American singer-songwriters
1994 births
Living people
People from Boston